Kukarmunda  is one of seven Tehsils of Tapi district in South  Gujarat. Originally Kukarmunda was a village and its tehsil Nizar but when the government separated Tapi district from Surat in the year 2007, Kukarmunda became a tehsil. The distance between Kukarmunda and Vyara is about 110 km and Surat is about 178 km. Kukarmunda shares a border with Akkalkuwa Taloda and Shahada tehsil of Nandurbar district of Maharashtra.Total area of Kukarmunda Town is 0.82 KM²

Transport 

Kukarmunda is well connected with Gujarat SH-198 and NH-720B(2KM).

Bus:
Kukarmunda is connected with GSRTC 
and MSRTC buses from kukarmunda 

GSRTC Buses

Kukarmunda-Surat
Kukarmunda-Valsad
Kukarmunda-Navsari
Kukarmunda-Mandvi(umarpada)

MSRTC buses

Akkalkuwa-Nandurbar 
Khapar-Nandurbar
Selamba-Nandurbar 
stop in Kukarmunda

Railway:
Nandurbar railway station is nearest railway station from Kukarmunda about 30KM and major railway station are Surat, Vadodra, Jalgaon, Bhusawal

Air:
Surat Airport is nearest airport from kukarmunda (172KM) and other is 
Vadodara Airport,International airports is Ahmedabad international airport(317 KM)
Chatrapati Shivaji Maharaj International Airport Mumbai(400 KM)

Facility 

Hospital:
Kukarmunda Civil Hospital with Ambulance Service 

Market:
APMC (Agriculture Produce Market Committee) Market 

Government offices:
Kukarmunda Taluka Panchayat
Group Gram Panchayat Fulwadi(Kukarmunda)
Taluka Seva Sadan
Police Station Kukarmunda

Hotels:
Vishram Gruh is located in kukarmunda nebour Taluka seva Sadan including VIP rooms normal rooms.

Bus Stand:
Bus Stand is located near highway. 

Main occupation:
Business
Farming

Education 

Kukarmunda Primary School

SK Kapadia School

Shri Saraswati Vidhalaya(Secondary school)

Tapi Nursary School,English Medium

ITI Kukarmunda

Statistics 

At about 1960 kukarmunda was very very small village and situated on the bank of river tapi but due to floods and cyclones Gujarat Government Transfer village in about 1980 at 4 km far from bank of river tapi at 1980 kukarmunda was very small and undeveloped village but from 1980 to 2007 kukarmunda did many progress and become taluka and till there was progress in kukarmunda situation. Currently kukarmunda is developed village and also very busy village

Geography 

Coordinates: 21°31′N 74°08′E

Evolution-400 ft from mean sea level

Banks 
Bank of Baroda, Surat district cooperative Bank,Fincare small Finance Bank this three banks are located in Kukarmunda

Villages of Kukarmunda Taluka 

Akkalutar
Amode Tarfe Satone
Amode Tarfe Talode
Aste Tarfe Budhaval
Ashrava
Ashapur
Bahurupa
Balambe
Balde
Bej
Bhamsal
Borikuwa
Chirmati
Chokhiamli
Dabriamba
Fulwadi
Gadid
Gangtha
Gorasa
Hathode
Hol
Itwai
Jhapampi-alis Jhampa Amli
Jhumkathi
Kelani
Kevdamoi
Kondraj
Kukarmunda
Korala
Mataval
Medhpur
Modale
Moramba
Nimbhore
Parod
Pati
Patipada
PIPLASH 
Pishavar
Rajpur
Ranaichi
Sadagvan
Satola
Taranda
Tulse
Ubhad
Umja
Untavad
Varpada
Ziribeda

Rivers 

Tapi river is major river of kukarmunda about 4km and also water source of town.

Religious Places 

Shri Swami Samartha Kendra

Pati Mata Temple

Khandoji Maharaj Temple

Shri Rama Mandir

Valhari Mata Temple

Saibaba Temple

ISKCON(International Society for Krishna Consciousness)

Kukarmunda Mosque
Suburban area of Surat
Neighbourhoods in Surat